Kevin Foley (born May 24, 1987) is an American professional golfer.

Foley was born in New Brunswick, New Jersey. He graduated from Penn State University in 2010 and turned professional.

Foley played on Web.com Tour in 2012 without a tour card. He earned four top-10 finishes and finished 52nd on the money list. In 2013, he won the first event of the season, the Panama Claro Championship. He finished 24th on the 2013 Web.com Tour regular season money list to earn his 2014 PGA Tour card. He ended 201st in the 2014 FedEx Cup, so he lost his PGA Tour card and also missed the Web.com Tour Finals.

Amateur wins
2009 Sunnehanna Amateur

Professional wins (2)

Web.com Tour wins (1)

Other wins (1)
2011 New Jersey State Open

Results in major championships

CUT = missed the half-way cut
Note: Foley only played in the U.S. Open.

See also
2013 Web.com Tour Finals graduates

References

External links

American male golfers
Penn State Nittany Lions men's golfers
PGA Tour golfers
Korn Ferry Tour graduates
Golfers from New Jersey
Sportspeople from New Brunswick, New Jersey
Sportspeople from Somerville, New Jersey
1987 births
Living people